Whispers is a 1920 American silent drama film directed by William P.S. Earle and starring Elaine Hammerstein, Matt Moore and Charles K. Gerrard.

Cast
 Elaine Hammerstein as 	Daphne Morton
 Matt Moore as Pat Darrick
 Phil Tead as Wesley Maced 
 Ida Darling as Aunt Carolina
 Bernard Randall as 	Shepley
 Warren Cook as 	Saxon
 Maude Hill as Marion Summers
 Templar Saxe as Parker

References

Bibliography
 Connelly, Robert B. The Silents: Silent Feature Films, 1910-36, Volume 40, Issue 2. December Press, 1998.
 Munden, Kenneth White. The American Film Institute Catalog of Motion Pictures Produced in the United States, Part 1. University of California Press, 1997.

External links
 

1920 films
1920 drama films
1920s English-language films
American silent feature films
Silent American drama films
American black-and-white films
Films directed by William P. S. Earle
Selznick Pictures films
1920s American films